The 18th Squadron is a helicopter squadron in the Air Component of the Belgian Armed Forces which operates the NHIndustries NH90 TTH.

References

Helicopter Squadron, 018